is a professional Japanese baseball player.

Family 
He has three sons of the football player.
His eldest son Toshiyuki is playing in Cerezo Osaka, Yoshiaki are currently playing in Albirex Niigata, and his third son Daisuke is playing in Gamba Osaka.

External links

1958 births
Living people
Baseball people from Yamaguchi Prefecture
Chuo University alumni
Japanese baseball players
Nippon Professional Baseball infielders
Yokohama Taiyō Whales players
Yokohama BayStars players
Nippon Ham Fighters players
Japanese baseball coaches
Nippon Professional Baseball coaches